The Microbotryales are an order of fungi in the Microbotryomycetes class of the Basidiomycota. The order contains 2 families, 9 genera, and 114 species. The order was circumscribed in 1997.

References

External links

 
Basidiomycota orders
Taxa named by Franz Oberwinkler
Taxa described in 1997